Manfred Schnelldorfer (born 2 May 1943) is a German former figure skater. He is the 1964 Olympic champion, the 1964 World champion, and an eight-time German national champion.

Personal life 
Manfred Schnelldorfer was born on 2 May 1943 in Munich, Bavaria, the son of two figure skating coaches. His father had skated in an ice revue but saw its milieu as a harmful influence.

Manfred Schnelldorfer studied architecture at TH-München but put his studies on hold for financial reasons. A resident of Munich, he is married and has two children.

Career

Competitive 
Schnelldorfer won his first competition at age eight. He was coached by his parents and skated for the Munich ERC club. Internationally, he represented the Federal Republic of Germany (West Germany).

Schnelldorfer finished second behind Hans-Jürgen Bäumler at the German Junior Championships. The following year, he won the German senior title while Bäumler finished fourth.

At age 20, he won the gold medal at the 1964 Winter Olympics in Innsbruck, became one of the youngest male figure skating Olympic champions. His victory was a surprise. The favorite was Alain Calmat of France, who won the Europeans between 1962 and 1964 and was silver medalist at the 1963 Worlds.

In all, Schnelldorfer was an eight-time German champion, one-time World champion (1964), three-time bronze and two-time silver medalist at the Europeans.

Post-competitive 
After his Olympic win, the Ice Capades offered Schnelldorfer a $1.5 million three-year contract but he declined because of a promise to his parents. For two years beginning in 1967, he served as the sports director, officially "national coach", of the Deutsche Eislauf Union. After his parents gave their approval, he performed with the Deutsche Eistheater from 1969 to 1973.

Schnelldorfer was also a pop singer (German: Schlagersänger) and actor before becoming a coach and sport teacher. He was the first West German national coach for figure skating between 1974 and 1981.

Schnelldorfer owns some sport shops.

Songs
 Wenn du mal allein bist (When you are once alone)
 Deine schönen blauen Augen (Your beautiful blue eyes)
 Mizzie

Films
 Holiday in St. Tropez (1964)
 Ich kauf' mir lieber einen Tirolerhut (1965)  (I prefer to buy a Tiroler hat)
 Tausend Takte Übermut (1965) (Thousand takts high spirits)
 Spukschloß im Salzkammergut (1966)
 Komm mit zur blauen Adria (1966)  (Come to the Blue Adriatic)

Competitive highlights

References

 several issues of the German Eissportmagazin
 several issues of the German magazin Pirouette
 program of the World Championships in Figure Skating 1991 in Munich
 program of the World Championships in Figure Skating 2004 in Dortmund

External links 
 
 

1943 births
Living people
German male single skaters
German male singers
German-language singers
German male film actors
Olympic figure skaters of the United Team of Germany
Olympic gold medalists for the United Team of Germany
Olympic medalists in figure skating
Figure skaters at the 1960 Winter Olympics
Figure skaters at the 1964 Winter Olympics
Medalists at the 1964 Winter Olympics
World Figure Skating Championships medalists
European Figure Skating Championships medalists
Technical University of Munich alumni
Sportspeople from Munich